Running Riot in '84 is punk rock band Cock Sparrer's third studio album, released in 1984.

Track listing
All titles written by Cock Sparrer

 "Run with the Blind"
 "Is Anybody There?"
 "Price Too High to Pay"
 "Think Again"
 "Don't Say a Word"
 "The Sun Says"
 "They Mean Murder"
 "Closedown"
 "Chip on my Shoulder" (live)
 "Runnin' Riot" (live)
 "The Sun Says" (Oi! LP version) (1996 CD Bonus Track)

Personnel
 Colin McFaul − vocals
 Steve Burgess − bass
 Steve Bruce − drums
 Shugs O'Neil − lead guitar
 Chris Skepis − rhythm guitar

Release history

References

1984 albums
Cock Sparrer albums
Pirate Press Records albums